In mathematics, a trigonometric series  is an infinite series of the form

 

an infinite version of a trigonometric polynomial.

It is called the Fourier series of the integrable function  if the coefficients  and  have the form:

Examples 

Every Fourier series gives an example of a trigonometric series.
Let the function  on  be extended periodically (see sawtooth wave).  Then its Fourier coefficients are:

Which gives an example of a trigonometric series:

The converse is false however, not every trigonometric series is a Fourier series. The series

is a trigonometric series which converges for all  but is not a Fourier series.

Uniqueness of Trigonometric series
The uniqueness and the zeros of trigonometric series was an active area of research in 19th century Europe. First, Georg Cantor proved that if a trigonometric series is convergent to a function  on the interval , which is identically zero, or more generally, is nonzero on at most finitely many points, then the coefficients of the series are all zero.

In fact, he proved a more general result. Let S0 = S and let Sk+1 be the derived set of Sk. If there is a finite number n for which Sn is finite, then all the coefficients are zero. Later, Lebesgue proved that if there is a countably infinite ordinal α such that Sα is finite, then the coefficients of the series are all zero. Cantor's work on the uniqueness problem famously led him to invent transfinite ordinal numbers, which appeared as the subscripts α in S''α .

Notes

References

See also
Denjoy–Luzin theorem

Fourier series